Images is the third studio album by Christian singer/songwriter Kathy Troccoli, released in 1986 on Reunion Records. It did not sell as well as her previous two albums. Despite that, Images still earned Troccoli a Grammy nomination for Best Gospel Performance, Female  at the 30th Grammy Awards in 1988. After the release of Images, Troccoli embarked on a five-year sabbatical from her recording career and would not release another album until 1991's Pure Attraction. Images peaked at No. 25 on the Billboard Top Inspirational Albums chart.

Track listing 
 "Ready and Willing" (Wayne Kirkpatrick, Dann Huff, Phil Naish) – 5:45
 "Talk It Out" (Kathy Troccoli, Naish, Kirkpatrick) – 4:36
 "Dream On" (Troccoli, Naish, Kirkpatrick, Huff) – 5:32
 "Don't Wanna See You Down" (Troccoli, Pam Mark Hall, Naish) – 4:16
 "Chance of a Lifetime" (Kirkpatrick, Huff, Naish) – 4:18
 "Love Stays" (Troccoli, Mark Baldwin) – 5:14
 "No Time for Love" (Troccoli, Kirkpatrick, Naish) – 4:04
 "If Only" (Troccoli, Jack Fowler) – 3:43
 "Gotta Keep Dancin'" (Troccoli, Naish, Kirkpatrick) – 5:15

Personnel 
 Kathy Troccoli – lead vocals, backing vocals (9)
 Phil Naish – keyboards 
 Dann Huff – guitars (1-7, 9)
 Mike Brignardello – bass (1, 9), fretless bass (9)
 Neil Stubenhaus – bass (2, 4, 6, 7)
 Gary Lunn – fretless bass (3)
 David Huff – drum programming (1, 9), drums (5, 7)
 Paul Leim – drums (2, 6), drum programming (3)
 John Robinson – drums (4)
 Paulinho da Costa – percussion (4)
 Lisa Bevill – backing vocals (1, 3)
 Chris Eaton – backing vocals (3, 5)
 Gary Janney – backing vocals (4, 9)

Production
 Michael Blanton – executive producer 
 Dan Harrell – executive producer 
 Dann Huff – producer 
 Phil Naish – producer 
 Jeff Balding – recording, mixing (2, 4, 8, 9)
 Csaba Petocz – recording, mixing (1, 3, 5, 6)
 Spencer Chrislu – additional engineer 
 David Pierce – additional engineer 
 Dave Cline – overdub engineer 
 Dan Garcia – overdub engineer 
 Bill Brunt – art direction 
 Scott Bonner – photography 
 Ron Keith – photography

Charts

Radio singles

References

1986 albums
Kathy Troccoli albums
Reunion Records albums